is a tile-matching video game developed and released by Taito for arcades in 1989. It was ported to the Nintendo Entertainment System, Game Boy, PC Engine, X68000, Amiga, Atari ST, Amstrad CPC, Commodore 64, MS-DOS, and ZX Spectrum between 1990 and 1991. Home computer ports were handled by Ocean Software; the 2003 PlayStation port was handled by Altron. The arcade and FM Towns versions had adult content, showing a naked woman at the end of the level; this was removed in the international arcade release (but not the US one) and other home ports. A completed Apple IIGS version was cancelled after Taito America shut down.

Puzznic bears strong graphical and some gameplay similarities to Taito's own Flipull/Plotting.



Reception

In Japan, Game Machine listed Puzznic on their December 1, 1989 issue as being the fourth-most-successful table arcade unit of the month.

The game was ranked the 34th best game of all time by Amiga Power.

Legacy

Many clones share the same basic gameplay of Puzznic but have added extra features over the years: Puzztrix on the web and on PC, Addled and Germinal on the iPhone, Puzzled on mobile phones. A clone for the PC, Brix, was released by Epic MegaGames in 1992. For Android devices, a clone called PuzzMagic! appeared in 2015. An iPhone clone also available with the title Gem Panic. Blockbusterz Hard Puzzle Game for iOS appeared in 2019.

References

External links
History of Puzznic

Website puzznic.com

1989 video games
Amiga games
Amstrad CPC games
Altron games
Arcade video games
Atari ST games
Commodore 64 games
Eroge
FM Towns games
Game Boy games
Information Global Service games
Mobile games
MSX games
NEC PC-9801 games
Nintendo Entertainment System games
PlayStation (console) games
Puzzle video games
X68000 games
TurboGrafx-16 games
Ocean Software games
Taito arcade games
Taito L System games
ZX Spectrum games
Video games developed in Japan